Kurkhars is the original female traditional headdress of the Ingush. its male counterpart is the Bashlyk. Kurkhars is an attribute of the dress, traditionally, it was weekend clothing oft the Ingush, worn during the holidays and "going out". They are made of red felt or dense cloth, though they originally have been made out of tanned and dyed Bull Scrotum, they are high caps in the form of a ridge with a forward curve and forked end.

First mentioned in a 17th-century article list of Russian ambassadors describing their route through the Ingush lands to Georgia, researchers consider Kurkhars, like the Bashlyk, in historical and cultural relationship with the ancient headdress of the Scythians and Phrygians, via the so-called "Phrygian cap", which also was most notably worn by the Persians, Thracians and Dacians.

A large collection of "Kurkharses" were collected by archaeologists from a tower-shaped two-story crypt of the late Middle Ages in the village of Päling. The finds amazed scientists not only with their abundance, but also with their rich decoration, which used both local materials and very expensive imported fabrics ( silk, semi-silk, satin, velvet, brocade ) of Iranian, Chinese, Egyptian, Syrian, Russian production. Kurkhars were made using gold and silver embroidery and using various materials: felt, leather, beads, beads, shells, silver plaques. Techniques were also distinguished by originality and special elegance

References 

Ingush people
Headgear